Lisa Posthumus Lyons (born June 12, 1980) is an American politician from Alto, Michigan, and served three terms as a Republican member of the Michigan House of Representatives from District 86 (portions of Ionia and Kent Counties) from 2011 - 2016. In 2016 she was elected Kent County Clerk / Register of Deeds.

The only woman to hold countywide office in Kent County, Michigan, Lyons was named by the Grand Rapids Business Journal as one of The 50 Most Influential Women in West Michigan in 2018.

She is the daughter of Dick Posthumus, who served as Lieutenant Governor of Michigan from 1999 to 2003 and was the Republican nominee for governor in 2002.

Background 
Posthumus Lyons describes herself as the fourth generation to own their family's farm in Alto. She graduated from Lowell High School and from Michigan State University with a bachelor's degree in Agricultural and Natural Resources Communications. Prior to elected office, Lyons was Director of Public Policy & Community Outreach for the Grand Rapids Association of Realtors. Lyons and her husband Brad, who is a deputy sheriff in Kent County, have four children: Easton, Charlie, Gage, and Fisher.

Michigan House of Representatives 
In the 2010 general election, Posthumus Lyons beat Frank Hammond with 25,943 votes, to 10,996 for Hammond and 909 for Libertarian Robin VanLoon. She was subsequently re-elected in 2012 and 2014. During her tenure, she chaired the House standing committees on education and on ethics and elections, and authored 32 Public Acts that were signed into law. Posthumus Lyons was term-limited in 2016 after serving three terms.

Kent County, Michigan 
In the 2016 General Election, Lyons was elected to the combined office of Kent County Clerk / Register of Deeds with 158,341 votes to Democratic Party candidate Christopher Reader's 115,244 votes, and Libertarian candidate James Lewis' 16,017 votes.  She began her four-year term of office in January 2017.

The Kent County Clerk's Office has three major functions: to manage County elections; to manage vital County records; and to process and maintain all Circuit Court files. In Kent County, the Clerk is also the Register of Deeds. The Clerk is also the Clerk of the Board of Commissioners, and statutorily serves on numerous County boards and commissions.

2018 Michigan Gubernatorial Campaign 

On August 15, 2018, Michigan Attorney General Bill Schuette announced Lyons as his running mate for his gubernatorial campaign. Her nomination was confirmed by the Michigan Republican State Convention on August 25, 2018 and she officially joined the Republican ticket as candidate for Lieutenant Governor of the State of Michigan. The pair lost the general election on November 6, 2018 to the Democratic ticket of Gretchen Whitmer and Garlin Gilchrist.

Controversies 
 In 2012, after supporting a right-to-work law, Lisa Posthumus Lyons went on to propose an amendment exempting corrections officers. Her husband, Brad Lyons, was a corrections officer at that time. Her response to the alleged conflict of interest was that Democrats have suggested the same sort of legislation in the past, and that her constituency includes hundreds of corrections officers.
 In June 2013, during a school dissolution bill debate, Lisa Posthumus Lyons made the remark "Pigs get fat, hogs get slaughtered" in response to the request that surrounding districts interview the teachers from the dissolving school. Many considered her remarks disproportionate to the request, and a former teacher of hers sent a letter condemning her use of the phrase. Her response to criticism was that her remarks were meant for lobbyists (the teachers' union) and not the teachers themselves.

Electoral history

References

External links 
 
Clerk/Register campaign website

1980 births
21st-century American politicians
21st-century American women politicians
American people of Dutch descent
County officials in Michigan
Living people
Republican Party members of the Michigan House of Representatives
Michigan State University alumni
People from Kent County, Michigan
Women state legislators in Michigan